PPS.Phetchabun City Football Club (Thai สโมสรฟุตบอลพีพีเอส เพชรบูรณ์ ซิตี้), is a Thai football club based in Bangkok, Thailand. The club is currently playing in the 2018 Thailand Amateur League Northern Region.

Record

References
 PPS.Phetchabun City news
 http://www.supersubthailand.com/news/17730-33/index.html#sthash.2HSnVZWl.dpbs
 https://www.fourfourtwo.com/th/features/taamrynkhraemsd-17-thiimehnuuelaangsuusuek-emecchrliik?page=0%2C4

External links
 Facebook  Page

Association football clubs established in 2016
Football clubs in Thailand
Sport in Tak province
2016 establishments in Thailand